Richwoods Township is an inactive township in Washington County, in the U.S. state of Missouri.

Richwoods Township was erected in 1852, taking its name from Richwoods, Missouri.

References

Townships in Missouri
Townships in Washington County, Missouri